Parish council elections took place across Broxtowe's parishes on 2 May 2019, alongside local elections in the borough.

Background
Parish councils are the lowest tier of local government in England. Elections to these bodies are usually non-partisan, with most councillors sitting as independents. Where there are an equal number or fewer candidates than there are vacancies, all candidates are elected unopposed, and no poll is taken. If a poll is necessary, voting is done under the plurality block voting system in most cases, unless the parish is split into wards with a ward electing one councillor, in which case first-past-the-post voting is used.

Broxtowe is divided into 9 parish councils, with parts of the Beeston and Stapleford Urban District being unparished. All of these cover a single parish. The councils of Eastwood, Kimberley and Stapleford are styled as town councils.

Results
A total of 98 seats were elected. Polls took place in four parish councils (only one ward in Eastwood and Nuthall were contested, and two in Stapleford were contested). Independents won 83 seats, the Conservatives won 9, Labour won 4, and the Liberal Democrats won 2.

Results by council

Awsworth (uncontested)

Brinsley

Cossall (uncontested)

Eastwood

Greasley (uncontested)
No nominations were received for Greasley Larkfields or Watnall wards.

Kimberley (uncontested)

Nuthall

Stapleford

Trowell (uncontested)

References

Parish councils of England
May 2019 events in the United Kingdom
Elections in Nottinghamshire